is a Japanese light novel series by Ichiro Sakaki and illustrated by Yukinobu Azumi, also known as the popular adult dōjin artist Nakayohi Mogudan. In 2003, it was adapted into an anime series produced by Bones.

Scrapped Princess is notable for its music, which is composed by Masumi Itō, and its themes. It begins as high fantasy and then quickly mixes into varying degrees of post-apocalyptic and science fiction elements through the application of Clarke's third law. The atmosphere has undertones of sadness, though many of the characters and situations are superficially light-hearted.

Story

The story takes place in what appears to be a fantasy world (revealed later to be Earth in the distant future) and revolves around a girl named Pacifica Casull, the sister in a pair of twins born to the royal family of a kingdom called Leinwan. Pacifica is abandoned at birth. The 5111th Grendel Prophecy predicts that she is the "poison that will destroy the world" if she reaches her sixteenth birthday. To prevent this, she is dropped off a cliff as an infant ("scrapped").

Pacifica is rescued by a court wizard and adopted by the commoner Casull family. Her foster siblings, Shannon, a swordsman, and Raquel, a wizard, become her protectors. Both siblings are extremely powerful and, more often than not, they easily break out of whatever difficult situation they face. Her siblings travel with her throughout most of the story, protecting her from the numerous attempts on her life by people who fear the outcome of the prophecy. Both siblings' skills see constant use. By contrast, Pacifica is mostly a typical fifteen-year-old and her inability to defend herself is a recurring source of self-doubt for her, as is the constantly repeated insistence that she will destroy the world.

As the series progresses, the truth about the prophecy slowly comes to light, but even as more of the truth is revealed, more questions arise. Pacifica must discover her hidden destiny, as powerful beings called Peacemakers, who are worshipped in this world as demi-gods, continually manoeuvre to have her destroyed. At the same time, a mysterious being called a Dragoon comes to the aid of Pacifica and her guardians, offsetting the attack of the Peacemakers. It turns out that Pacifica is not "the poison that will destroy the world", but humanity's last hope, as part of a plan that was set in motion 5000 years before by scientists among the human resistance during what were called the Genesis Wars.

Before the Genesis Wars, the Peacemakers were created by humans as weapons against humanity's alien foes, but, determined to protect their human creators and prevent them from destroying themselves, the Peacemakers switched sides and assisted the aliens by imprisoning the survivors of the war in an artificial environment, while at the same time backing up their cultural development to the Middle Ages. The Peacemakers were able to do this with the help of a gifted psychic named Celia Mauser, who, like the Peacemakers themselves, had originally been a tool of the defense. Her powers were used to enhance humanity's weaponry, to the point where it was possible to predict enemy movements. The Peacemakers encouraged Celia Mauser to leak information to them in exchange for the lives of her brother and sister. She was too late; her siblings died, and Celia Mauser's treason was for nothing. Celia was then kept in an area of phase space in a sort of virtual reality for 5000 years, while humanity continued to live on unknowingly in an intangible cage, isolated on a single continent called Dusbin. Her powerful mind was programmed into the artificial environment's control system, and the religion concocted by the aliens to control humanity worships her as a god.

For 5000 years, the Peacemakers watched over humanity, keeping cultural development at a standstill, and prepared to wipe out much of the human race if it ever showed any sign of stepping beyond its apportioned limits (as the Kingdom of Leinwan does toward the end of the series when the attempt is made to coerce the Peacemakers into helping them conquer the world). As the Peacemakers put it, "You don't know you are trapped if all you've ever known is your cage." Humans are completely incapable of resisting the will of the Peacemakers. Just looking a Peacemaker in the eye renders a human obedient – even Shannon and Raquel are not immune to this. Pacifica is the only human being in 5000 years who is immune to this control, and her ability will become communicable to others once she reaches her sixteenth birthday. This is why the Peacemakers are determined to destroy her, and why they have used the Grendel Prophecies to induce others to do the job for them, since Pacifica cannot be directly attacked by the Peacemakers. In the end, Pacifica's twin brother, Prince Forsyth, who has seen the suffering inflicted on his people by the Peacemakers in their attempts to eliminate Pacifica, asks to meet her. Her guardians allow it and he uses the opportunity to stab her in the back, ten hours before she turns sixteen. This causes her to be removed to the phase sphere, where she meets Celia Mauser and is given the choice of whether humanity will remain in their prison or not. Pacifica chooses freedom.

Timeline
Scrapped Princess takes place somewhere between the years 7000 AD to 7500 AD (8th millennium). In episode 13, it is discussed aboard the Skid that humankind is approximately at same progress level of the Middle Ages. It is also said the Middle Ages occurred 6,000 years ago. Considering the Middle Ages to be around 1000−1500 AD, 6000 years can be added onto that to get a rough estimate of the time frame. This also places the Genesis War between 2000 AD and 2500 AD (7500−5000=2500), since the Genesis War took place 5,000 years before the current date.

Media

Light novel

The series, written by Ichiro Sakaki and illustrated by Yukinobu Azumi, was published from 1999 to 2003 in thirteen volumes. Five volumes of short story collections were published from 2002 to 2005.
Between May and November 2007, first three of the original light novels have been released in English by Tokyopop.

Manga
The manga adaptation illustrated by Yabuki Go was published from 2002 to 2004 and collected into three volumes. It has also been published in the US by Tokyopop between August 2005 and May 2006. The manga has no plot overlap with the anime adaptation; the only things in common are the three main characters, the idea of the Scrapped Princess, and the Mauser Faith they are running from. Another one-volume manga, illustrated by Megumi Ikeda, Scrapped Princess Su Thep, was released on May 28, 2003.

Another three-volume manga adaptation illustrated by Toshinori Sogabe was published from 2016 to 2018 in Famitsu Comic Clear online magazine.

Anime

The 24-episode anime adaptation by studio Bones aired from April to October 2003. The anime was originally distributed in the United States by Bandai Entertainment, but was later picked up by Funimation.

Game
A role-playing game titled Scrapped Princess RPG and set in the Scrapped Princess universe was released in 2003. It is based on the Sword World RPG system. Kazuhito Kuroda (group SNE) is the main designer. It was released as a paperback version from Fujimi Shobo in 2003.

References

External links
Yahoo directory for Scrapped Princess with more links
 
 

Book series introduced in 1999
1999 Japanese novels
2002 manga
2003 anime television series debuts
2003 Japanese television series endings
Anime and manga based on light novels
Bandai Entertainment anime titles
Bones (studio)
Fujimi Fantasia Bunko
Fujimi Shobo manga
Funimation
Ichirō Sakaki
Kadokawa Dwango franchises
Light novels
Sword and sorcery anime and manga
Shōnen manga
Television series about princesses
Tokyopop titles
Wowow original programming